Haematopinus oliveri, known commonly as the pygmy hog-sucking louse, is a critically endangered species of insect in the suborder Anoplura, the sucking lice. It is an ectoparasite found only on another critically endangered species, the pygmy hog (Porcula salvania). It is endemic to India and can now only be found in parts of north-western Assam.

References

 

Endemic fauna of India
Lice
Insects described in 1978
Taxonomy articles created by Polbot